An independent station is an independent radio or terrestrial television station which is independent in some way from broadcast networks. The definition of "independence" varies from country to country, reflecting governmental regulations, market environment and the broadcasting medium's development history. 

In the United States and Canada, an independent station is a broadcast station which is not directly affiliated with any large network.

In Japan, an independent station is a terrestrial station which is not a member of any networks whose dominant stations are located in Tokyo; see Japanese Association of Independent Television Stations (JAITS) for more details. In addition, although The Open University of Japan is not a member of JAITS, it can also be classified as independent.

See also

List of independent television stations in the U.S.

Television terminology
Independent television stations